John Wallaesa (August 31, 1919 – December 27, 1986) was an American professional baseball shortstop. He played in Major League Baseball (MLB) for five seasons with the Philadelphia Athletics in 1940, 1942, and 1946, and the Chicago White Sox from 1947 to 1948.

External links

Major League Baseball shortstops
Philadelphia Athletics players
Chicago White Sox players
Kansas City Blues (baseball) players
Buffalo Bisons (minor league) players
Toronto Maple Leafs (International League) players
Newark Bears (IL) players
Springfield Cubs players
Wilmington Blue Rocks (1940–1952) players
Federalsburg A's players
Little Rock Travelers players
Baseball players from Pennsylvania
Sportspeople from Easton, Pennsylvania
1919 births
1986 deaths